Odesa Film Studio is the Ukrainian, formerly Soviet film studio in Odesa, one of the first in the Russian Empire and the Soviet Union. It is partially owned by a government and supervised by the Department of State property fund of Ukraine together with the Ministry of Culture. Together with Dovzhenko Film Studios they are the only state-owned and major film producers in the country. The studio is located at Frantsuzky bulvar 33 (33 French Boulevard), Odesa, Ukraine. In a close vicinity to it is located a smaller film studio House of Mask.

History and reorganization
 It was founded on 23 May 1919 by the decision of the Odesa Governorate Executive Committee, Ukrainian SSR out of the remnants of cinema studios of Myron Grossman, Dmitriy Kharitonov, and Borisov. This date was the day of birth of the first in the country state film studio. At first, it was listed as "Political film section of political department and of 41st Division of the Red Army", and the first feature film filmed here was the "Spiders and flies." The original studios went into decline after the Russian Civil War and the Ukrainian War of Independence, as their owners emigrated, running from political prosecution. Grossman's film studio "Myrograph" existed in Odesa since 1907 and was the oldest one recorded in Ukraine.
 In 1922, "film sektion" was reorganized into Odesa Film Factory of  All-Ukrainian Photo Cinema Administration (VUFKU). The Odesa film studio, which was VUFKU’s main production facility, underwent extensive renovations. The studio purchased its new modern equipment in the West, allowing the studio to shoot, light, and process the film stock using state-of-the-art technology. In 1926, Vyacheslav Levandovskyi and Deviatkin created an animation studio of VUFKU.
 In 1930, VUFKU was reorganized into "Ukrainafilm" of "Soyuzkino" (Union-cinema).
 From 1938 to 1941 - Odesa film studio.
 During the years of the Second World War (Eastern Front 1941-1945) it was a part of the Tashkent Film Studio.
 1954 - again works in Odesa.
 In 1955, the Odesa Film Studio resumed its own film production. Director Alexander Gorky not only obtained permission to revive the studio, but also solved the personnel problem by inviting VGIK graduates — directors, cameramen, artists, and economists. Then the former students, who usually went for years as assistants and assistants, quickly got independent work. On November 26, 1956, the film by Felix Mironer and Marlen Khutsiev “Spring on Zarechnaya Street” was released, which became a significant event not only for the studio, but for the entire Soviet cinema.
 In 2005, Odesa film studio was reorganized to a Close Joint Stock Company (with the government owning the majority of shares).

Description

Inside the studio's building is located another film studio, Vira Kholodna Film Studio and the Odesa Film School. The Odesa Film Studio has its own movie theater, U-Cinema, which is also located in the same building.

On the territory of the studio there is a Museum of the Cinema, in which you can find out about many interesting facts on the history of the cinema. Here you can find historic materials, from the invention of cinema, to the postmodern, digital and avant garde.

In 2019, the National Bank of Ukraine issued a commemorative coin 100 years Odesa Film Studio

In addition, the main Ukraine post service issued a special anniversary stamp dedicated to the Odesa film studio.

Cinema Museum 
On the territory of the Odesa film studio there is a cinema museum of the Odesa branch of the National Union of Cinematographers of Ukraine. The museum stores materials collected over the years of the existence of the Odesa Film Studio, film catalogs, photo albums of acting tests, information about directors and producers, film equipment, books, newspapers, film magazines, etc. In total, more than twelve thousand “storage units”.

Directors

Selected films

Soviet Union
 1926 Ягідка кохання / Love's Berries, directed by Oleksandr Dovzhenko (silent film)
 1926 Вася – реформатор / Vasia the Reformer, directed by Oleksandr Dovzhenko (silent film)
 1926 Тарас Трясило / Taras Triasylo, directed by Petro Chardynin (silent film)
 1926 Тарас Шевченко / Taras Shevchenko, directed by Petro Chardynin (silent film)
 1927 Сумка дипкур'єра / The Diplomatic Pouch, directed by Oleksandr Dovzhenko (silent film)
 1928 Арсенал / Arsenal, directed by Oleksandr Dovzhenko (silent film)
 1928 Звенигора / Zvenyhora, directed by Oleksandr Dovzhenko (silent film)
 1936 Назар Стодоля / Nazar Stodolia, directed by Heorhiy Tasin
 1941 Таємничий острів / Mysterious Island, directed by Eduard Pentslin
 1957 Орлёнок / Orlyonok, directed by Eduard Nikandrovich Bocharov
 1967 Короткі зустрічі / Brief Encounters, directed by Kira Muratova
 1978 Д'Артаньян та три мушкетери / D'Artagnan and Three Musketeers, directed by Heorhiy Yungvald-Khilkevych
 1979 Пригоди Електроніка / The Adventures of the Elektronic, directed by Kostiantyn Bromberg
 1979 Місце зустрічі змінити не можна / The Meeting Place Cannot Be Changed, directed by Stanislav Hovorukhin
 1982 Трест, що луснув / The Trust That Has Burst, directed by Oleksandr Pavlovskyi
 1982 Чарівники / Wizards, directed by Kostiantyn Bromberg
 1983 Серед сірих каменів / Among Grey Stones, directed by Kira Muratova
 1983 Військово-польовий роман / Wartime Romance, directed by Petro Todorovskyi
 1983 Колесо історії / Wheel of History, directed by Stanislav Klymenko
 1986 У пошуках капітана Гранта / In search of Captain Grant, directed by Stanislav Hovorukhin
 1987 Данило — князь Галицький / Danylo — Kniaz of Halychyna, directed by Yaroslav Lupiy
 1989 Астенічний синдром / The Asthenic Syndrome, directed by Kira Muratova

Ukraine
 1991 Чудо в краю забуття / Miracle in the Land of Oblivion, directed by Natalia Motuzko
 1999 Як коваль щастя шукав / How the Blacksmith Looked for Happiness, directed by Radomyr Vasylevsky
 2001 На Полі Крові / Akeldama, directed by Yaroslav Lupiy
 2007 Біля річки / At the River, directed by Eva Neymann

Selected directors
1919-1925
 Myron Grossman (1908-1918) (considered a founder of Odesa cinematography)
 Pyotr Chardynin (1923-1932)
 Les Kurbas (1922-1925)
 Georgiy Tasin, the first studio director in 1922
1926-1936
 Oleksandr Dovzhenko
 Isaak Babel
1936-1954
 Vladimir Braun
 Amvrosiy Buchma
1955-1965
 Kira Muratova and Oleksandr Muratov
 Vadym Kostromenko, currently the director of the museum
 Vadym Avloshenko
 Pyotr Todorovsky
1966-1996
 Georgi Yungvald-Khilkevich
 Stanislav Govorukhin 
 Aleksandr Pavlovsky
 Natalya Zbandut (Medyuk)
 Mykhailo Kats

Selected actors
1919-1925
 Vera Kholodnaya (1914-1919) (featured in 35 films)
 Daria Zerkalova
1926-1936
 Natalya Uzhviy
 Matviy Lyarov
1966-1996
 Vladimir Vysotsky

Others
 Samvel Gasparov

See also
 All-Ukrainian Photo Cinema Administration (VUFKU)
 Dovzhenko Film Studios
 Kyivnaukfilm
 National Cinematheque of Ukraine
 List of Ukrainian films

References

Bibliography 
 Histoire du cinéma ukrainien (1896–1995), Lubomir Hosejko, Éditions à Dié, Dié, 2001, traduit en ukrainien en 2005 : Istoria Oukraïnskovo Kinemotografa, Kino-Kolo, Kiev, 2005,

External links

 Non-official website Odesa film studio

 
1919 establishments in Ukraine
Film production companies of the Soviet Union
Film production companies of Ukraine
Ukrainian film studios
Mass media companies established in 1919
Government-owned companies of Ukraine